Henry Clifford is a grand opera in three acts composed by Isaac Albéniz to an English libretto written by Francis Money-Coutts (under the pseudonym "Mountjoy"). It premiered at the Gran Teatro del Liceo on 8 May 1895. The opera is based on historical figures and events and is set in 15th-century England during the Wars of the Roses, fought between the rival houses of Lancaster and York. The title character, Henry Clifford, 10th Baron Clifford, was the only son of John Clifford, a Lancastrian commander killed in the bloodiest battle of the war, the Battle of Towton, on 29 March 1461. Henry Clifford himself was one of the chief commanders in the Battle of Flodden against the Scots in 1513.

Composition
Henry Clifford was written in 1893–95, the first of a series of operas by Albéniz which were commissioned and supplied with English libretti by the wealthy Englishman Francis Money-Coutts. Other operas in the series are Pepita Jiménez (1896) and Merlin (1902). Albéniz began writing the opera while living in London, but subsequently moved to Barcelona where he completed the piano–vocal score for the second act. After a few months he became uncomfortable with the conservative cultural conditions under the Bourbon dynasty in Spain, and moved to Paris where the remainder of the work was completed in 1894–95.

Performance history
Albéniz conducted the premiere of Henry Clifford (under the title Enrico Clifford) in Barcelona at the Gran Teatro del Liceo on 8 May 1895. The singers included Emanuel Suagnes in the title role, Angelica Nava as Lady Clifford, and Andrés Perellò de Segurola as Sir John Saint-John. Although the opera was originally written in English, Italian was standard at the Liceo, and an Italian libretto was supplied by Giuseppe M. Arteaga Pereira. The libretto was published in both English and Italian (Barcelona: J.B. Pujol, 1895). The work was given five performances with the final performance on May 12.

The opera was reconstructed and recorded in 2002 by the Spanish musicologist and conductor José de Eusebio. On 24 January 2009, he conducted the Orquesta Filarmónica de Gran Canaria in the world premiere performance of Henry Clifford with its original English libretto in the Auditorio Alfredo Kraus, Las Palmas de Gran Canaria. The performance was in concert version with John MacMaster as Henry Clifford, Ana María Sánchez as Lady Clifford, María Rey-Joly as Annie Saint-John, David Wilson-Johnson as Sir John Saint-John, and Larissa Diadkova as Lady Saint-John.

Critical reception
Writing about the 1895 Barcelona premiere, the newspaper La Vanguardia reported that the "applause, acclamations, and shouts of enthusiasm ... still sound in our ears." The Spanish critic J. Roca y Roca, writing in the same newspaper, said: "Albéniz triumphed over everything: over the distrust of certain unimaginative spirits ill-disposed to recognize the superior merits of a composer who has excelled as an outstanding concert pianist; he has triumphed over the suspicions and fears of the theater management...; Albéniz, finally, has succeeded in becoming a prophet in his own country." The critic blamed the shortness of the run on inadequate rehearsal, a lack of support from the theater's management, and the fact that the first performances were at the end of the season.

Roles

Recording
Albéniz: Henry Clifford – Orquesta Sinfónica de Madrid
Conductor: José de Eusebio
Principal singers: Aquiles Machado (Henry Clifford); Alessandra Marc (Lady Clifford); Carlos Álvarez (Sir John Saint John); Jane Henschel (Lady Saint John); Ana Maria Martínez (Annie Saint John); Christian Immler (Colin); Ángel Rodríguez (Messenger).
Recording location & date: Auditorio Nacional de Música de Madrid, 19–27 July 2002
Label: Decca – 473 937-2 (2 CDs)

References

Sources

Further reading
Greenfield, Edward, Recording review: Albéniz: Henry Clifford – Orquesta Sinfónica de Madrid, Decca, The Guardian, 13 June 2003. Accessed 22 January 2009.
Woolf, Jonathan, Recording review: Albéniz: Henry Clifford – Orquesta Sinfónica de Madrid, Decca, Musicweb International, 2003. Accessed 22 January 2009.

External links
Libretto in English and the Italian translation used for the premiere.

Operas
1895 operas
English-language operas
Operas by Isaac Albéniz
Operas set in the 15th century
Operas based on real people
Operas set in England
Opera world premieres at the Liceu